Established in 1977 TUPAM Editores is the largest General Health, Medical and Pharmaceutical publisher in Portugal.

Publishing companies of Portugal